The Fuchsian theory of linear differential equations, which is named after Lazarus Immanuel Fuchs, provides a characterization of various types of singularities and the relations among them.

At any ordinary point of a homogeneous linear differential equation of order  there exists a fundamental system of  linearly independent power series solutions. A non-ordinary point is called a singularity. At a singularity the maximal number of linearly independent power series solutions may be less than the order of the differential equation.

Generalized series solutions 

 

which is known as Frobenius series, due to the connection with the Frobenius series method. Frobenius series solutions are formal solutions of differential equations.

 

where  denotes the falling factorial notation.

Indicial equation 
Let  be a linear differential operator of order  with one valued coefficient functions . Then there exists a smallest  such that  is a power series for all .

If  is a regular singularity, then  and if  is an irregular singularity,  holds. This is illustrated by the later examples.

Example: Regular singularity 

 

Example: Irregular singularity 

 

Certainly, at least one coefficient of the lower derivatives pushes the exponent of  down. Inevitably, the coefficient of a lower derivative is of smallest exponent.

Formal fundamental systems 
We have given a homogeneous linear differential equation  of order  with coefficients that are expandable as Laurent series with finite principle part. The goal is to obtain a fundamental set of formal Frobenius series solutions relative to any point . This can be done by the Frobenius series method, which says: The starting exponents are given by the solutions of the indicial equation and the coefficients describe a polynomial recursion. W.l.o.g., assume .

Fundamental system at ordinary point 
Due to the reason that the starting exponents are integers, the Frobenius series are power series.

Fundamental system at regular singularity 
If  is a regular singularity, one has to pay attention to roots of the indicial polynomial that differ by integers. In this case the recursive calculation of the Frobenius series' coefficients stops for some roots and the Frobenius series method does not give an -dimensional solution space.

 

One obtains a fundamental set of  linearly independent formal solutions, because the indicial polynomial relative to a regular singularity is of degree .

General result 
One can show that a linear differential equation of order  always has  linearly independent solutions of the form

 

References 

Differential equations